Gemini is the eighth studio album by American singer Brian McKnight. It was released by Motown Records on February 8, 2005 in the United States. The album's title is a reference to the singer's astrological sign, Gemini. Upon release, Gemini received mixed reviews from music critics. However, the album debuted at number 4 on the Billboard 200 album chart, becoming McKnight's highest-charting album to date. Gemini was preceded by two singles: "Everytime You Go Away" and "What We Do Here". Both songs charted in the Top 40 of Billboards Hot R&B/Hip-Hop Songs chart, with the latter staying there for two weeks. Gemini marked McKnight's last album on Motown Records.

Composition
"Everytime You Go Away" is a smooth ballad that has his signature quiet storm sound.

Critical reception

In his review for Allmusic, David Jeffries wrote: "Bring your lover and your playful side because Gemini is an aptly named loose and free bedroom winner from Brian McKnight [...] That's where the concessions to music of the moment stop, and while they're not at all unnecessary, the album really succeeds when McKnight wears all his singer, composer, musician, and producer hats at once and brews up something between Prince's self-titled release and a Sweetback album." Chris Rizik from SoulTracks found that "Gemini is a fairly typical McKnight album that his many (primarily female) fans will adore. As with his other CDs, there are a handful of excellent, well performed numbers [...] However, the lyrical mixed messages and groupie pandering leave me cold and prevent the album from reaching the level warranted by its solid musical foundation."

Sal Cinquemani from  Slant felt that Gemini, the singer’s seventh album, begins on a high note, the intro showcasing McKnight’s old school Motown harmonies, but the rest of the disc resurrects previous trends, matching the singer’s aural NyQuil (his trademark honey-dipped vocals) with the mildest of R&B formulas and hooks that barely register." PopMatters critics Jalylah Burrell wrote that "with Gemini, McKnight manages to escape the lure of his trend-conscious alter ego, another of the 30-plus entertainers who feel a need to justify their presence in a youth-obsessed market. Instead the album witnesses the musician just playing his fated position. Not all-star caliber but well enough for his faithful fans." People called Gemini "another dependable effort, [that] shows that McKnight is clearly not in the same league as Prince, Marvin or Luther. And now the veteran singer is also being passed by such youngbloods as Van Hunt and John Legend. Even so, his sophisticated soul can still be as smooth as satin sheets."

Track listing

Samples
"Grown Man Business" samples from "Can't Knock the Hustle" by Jay-Z and "Much Too Much" by Marcus Miller.
"Here with You" samples from "Love You Inside Out" by Bee Gees.

Charts

Weekly charts

Year-end charts

References

External links

2005 albums
Albums produced by Brian McKnight
Brian McKnight albums
Motown albums